Hans-Jürgen Köper (born 29 August 1951) is a German football manager and former player who played as a midfielder.

Career statistics

References

External links
 

1951 births
Living people
German footballers
Association football midfielders
Bundesliga players
VfL Bochum players
Sportspeople from Bochum
Footballers from North Rhine-Westphalia
West German footballers